TJ Va'a (born 10 June 1996) is a New Zealand rugby union player who plays for the  in the Super Rugby competition.  His position of choice is fly-half.

References

External links
 Va'a's New Zealand national under-20 rugby union team player profile from the allblacks.com website

New Zealand rugby union players
1996 births
Living people
Rugby union fly-halves